The tables below compare features of notable note-taking software.

General information

Basic features

Advanced formatting and content

See also
 Comparison of text editors
 Comparison of web annotation systems
 Comparison of wiki software
 Comparison of word processors
 List of personal information managers
 List of text editors
 List of wiki software
 Outliner
 Personal information manager
 Personal knowledge base

Notes

References

External links
 

 
Notetaking software
Note-taking
Text editor comparisons